Kružno is a village and municipality in the Rimavská Sobota District of the Banská Bystrica Region of southern Slovakia. The village is typical for more spaces between houses. which is not that typical in surrounding villages. Recently Kružnno attracts bicycle tourists. In Kružno there is a park, church, kindergarten and football pitch.

References

External links
 
 
http://www.kruzno.rimava.sk
http://www.e-obce.sk/obec/kruzno/1-sucasnost_obce.html

Villages and municipalities in Rimavská Sobota District